is a municipality in the southwestern part of Vestland county, Norway. It is part of the traditional district of Sogn. The administrative center of the municipality is the village of Eivindvik. Other villages in Gulen include Brekke, Byrknes, Dalsøyra, Dingja, Instefjord, Mjømna, Rutledal, and Ytre Oppedal.

The municipality of Gulen sits to the south of the Sognefjorden and it surrounds the Gulafjorden, which is considered to be the place where Norway's west-coastal Vikings met for the Gulating, a governing body. The area along the Gulafjorden called Flolid (just east of the village of Eivindvik) is now a national historic place, where an open-air theater and annual summer play commemorates the Vikings who gathered there 1000 years ago to accept Christianity.

The  municipality is the 190th largest by area out of the 356 municipalities in Norway. Gulen is the 265th most populous municipality in Norway with a population of 2,230.

In 2016, the chief of police for Vestlandet formally suggested a reconfiguration of police districts and stations. He proposed that the police station in Gulen be closed.

General information

Evindvig was established as a municipality on 1 January 1838 (see formannskapsdistrikt law). The municipality of 1838 was created to be identical to the Evindvig parish (prestegjeld) that included the three sub-parishes of Evindvig, Brekke, and Husøy. The sub-parish of Brekke (population: 898) was separated from the municipality in 1850 to form a municipality of its own, leaving a total of 3,944 residents in Evindvig. (Later, Brekke was merged with Lavik as the municipality of Lavik og Brekke. This was short-lived and Brekke later became a separate municipality once again.)  In 1858, the sub-parish of Husøy (population: 1,384) was separated from Evindvig to form its own municipality called Utvær (renamed Solund in 1923). This left Evindvig with 3,018 inhabitants. On 1 July 1890, the name of Evindvig municipality was officially changed to Gulen.

During the 1960s, there were many municipal mergers across Norway due to the work of the Schei Committee. On 1 January 1964, the municipality of Brekke (population: 782) was merged (back) with Gulen. Also on that same date, the island of Losna (population: 40) was transferred from Gulen to the neighboring municipality of Solund. After these changes, Gulen had a population of 3,250.

On 1 January 2020, the municipality became part of the newly created Vestland county after Sogn og Fjordane and Hordaland counties were merged.

Name
The name originally belonged to the fjord (now called Gulafjorden). The name is probably derived from the word gul which means "(strong) wind (gale)". Until 1891, the name of the municipality was Evenvig or Eivindvig (now written Eivindvik).

Coat of arms
The coat of arms was granted on 9 February 1990. The arms show two gray crosses on a blue background. The crosses represent the two stone crosses found near the village of Eivindvik that are believed to be about 1000 years old, erected there after the Vikings who met at the Gulating gathering embraced Christianity.

Churches
The Church of Norway has three parishes() within the municipality of Gulen. It is part of the Nordhordland prosti (deanery) in the Diocese of Bjørgvin.

Schools
The roughly 2,500 residents live scattered throughout the municipality and are divided into four school districts: Brekke, Eivindvik, Dalsøyra, and Byrknes.

Government
All municipalities in Norway, including Gulen, are responsible for primary education (through 10th grade), outpatient health services, senior citizen services, unemployment and other social services, zoning, economic development, and municipal roads. The municipality is governed by a municipal council of elected representatives, which in turn elect a mayor.  The municipality falls under the Sogn og Fjordane District Court and the Gulating Court of Appeal.

Municipal council
The municipal council  of Gulen is made up of 21 representatives that are elected to four year terms. The party breakdown of the council is as follows:

Mayor
The mayor  of a municipality in Norway is usually a representative of the majority party of the municipal council who is elected to lead the council. The mayors of Gulen (incomplete list):
2011–present: Hallvard S. Oppedal (Sp)
1999-2011: Trude Brosvik (KrF)
1983-1999: Ola Byrknes (Ap)
1978-1983: Olav Solheim (Ap)

Geography

Gulen has an area of about  including about 1500 small islands, islets, and skerries. The largest of the islands are Byrknesøyna, Hiserøyna, Mjømna, and Sandøyna.  The mainland is characterized by small valleys and large mountains crossing the landscape. The lake Dingevatn is one of Norway's deepest lakes.

Gulen is bounded on the north by the Sognefjorden and the Sognesjøen, and to the south by the Fensfjorden with the North Sea to the west of the municipality. Gulen is bordered by the municipalities of Solund and Hyllestad to the north (across the Sognefjorden), by Høyanger to the east, and by Austrheim (across the Fensfjorden), Lindås, and Masfjorden to the south.

The area is a geological region that contains a relatively low nutrition content ground, which characterizes the types of flora. The moors, which are frequently covered with wild purple heather, are the dominating picture of the area. Due to the large quantity of rain in the area, there are many types of moss and lichen in Gulen.  Most of the land in Gulen is very mountainous and inhospitable.

Climate
Gulen has a temperate oceanic climate (Cfb in the Köppen climate classification), also known as a marine west coast climate.
Gulen is among the wettest areas of Norway, with almost  of annual precipitaiton. The wettest season is autumn and winter, with December as the wettest month. The average date for the last overnight freeze (low below ) in spring is 19 April and average date for first freeze in autumn is 31 October giving a frost-free season of 194 days (1981-2010 average). The Takle weather station started recording in June 1950.

Economy
Historically, Gulen's economy has been centered around farming and fishing. More recently, Gulen has become important because of its close proximity to the Mongstad industrial area which includes many oil refineries operated by Statoil, Shell Oil, and other oil companies. Other factories and industries in Gulen include Wergeland-Halsvik, Baker Oil Tools, Johnny Birkeland Transport, and Vest Tank. There are many other small businesses located in Gulen today.

Tusenårsstedet Gulatinget

The Gulating was a legislative assembly which met regularly for a period of at least five hundred years in Gulen on the shores of the Gulafjorden. In 1300, the assembly was moved to Bergen. The members of the assembly represented the farmers of Western Norway. This was where important political issues were discussed and decisions were made. The old assembly was also used as a law court for both civil and criminal cases. The Gulating was thus related to the representative institutions of today such as the municipal council and the Norwegian Parliament, Storting.

A sculpture park was built in Flolid in Gulen in order to commemorate  the Gulating legislative assembly. Norwegian sculptor Bård Breivik was responsible for the artistic elements which were opened by the public during August 2005. The park is a work of art in its own right that is used as the setting for outdoor dance and musical performances in beautiful and unique natural surroundings.

Attractions

Sellevåg Wooden Shoe Factory
Wooden shoes were produced in Sellevåg from 1899 to 1975. The factory was powered by water in the Sellevåg Lake. The wooden shoe factory is still there with all its production equipment intact. A guided tour with demonstration can be arranged on request.

Trondheim Post-Road
The historic mail route from Bergen and Trondheim, The post-road goes through the municipalities of Fjaler, Hyllestad and Gulen. Built between 1801 and 1806, it passes over many beautiful stone bridges.

Notable people 
 Ole Elias Holck (1774 in Hyllestad -1842) a Norwegian military officer, rep. at the Norwegian Constitutional Assembly
 Peder Furubotn (1890 in Brekke – 1975) a Norwegian cabinetmaker, politician and resistance member
 Fredrik Lange-Nielsen (1891 in Eivindvik – 1980) a mathematician and insurance company manager

References

External links
Municipal fact sheet from Statistics Norway 
Gulatinget: Tusenårsstaden i Sogn og Fjordane 
Gulen Kommune 

 
Municipalities of Vestland
1838 establishments in Norway